The Big Four is an all-male Hong Kong musical group formed by Dicky Cheung, Andy Hui, William So, and Edmond Leung in 2009. They released their first self-titled single in 2009, in which the single topped most of Hong Kong's music charts. Their next single, "Unable to Love" (愛莫能助) in 2010, was also topped charts and received consistent airplay for many weeks.

The Big Four held their first concert, The Big Four World Tour, for five days in the Hong Kong Coliseum from March 11 to 15.

The Big Four held their second concert, The Big Four World Tour Live in Hong Kong 2013, for six days in the Hong Kong Coliseum from February 9 to 14.

The first television program hosted by them and named as "Big Four大四喜" was also released in May 2010.

The Big Hits Big Four (2010)
Big Four - Big Four
愛莫能助 ("Unable to Help") - Big Four
男人最痛 ("Man's Most Painful") - Andy Hui
紅顏知己 ("Confidante") - William So
七友 ("Seven Friends") - Edmond Leung
你愛我像誰 ("Who Do You Love Me As") - Dicky Cheung
男人不該讓女人流淚 ("Men Should Not Make Women Cry") - William So
纏綿遊戲 ("Touchy Game") - Edmond Leung
誰是個小丑 ("Who is the Clown") - Dicky Cheung
你傷風我感冒 ("You Catch a Cold, I Catch the Flu") - Andy Hui
傷了三個心 ("Have Hurt Three Hearts")- Edmond Leung
身體健康 ("Healthy Body") - Dicky Cheung
戀愛片段 ("A Strip of Loving") - Andy Hui
黑色禮服 ("Formal Blackwear") - Wiliam So
傾心傾意傾神 ("Heart, Attention, God") - Dicky Cheung
爛泥 ("Mud") - Andy Hui
來夜方長 ("A Long Time") - William So (featuring Kit Chan)
艦隊 ("Fleet") - Edmond Leung

Music charts

References

Cantopop musical groups
Cantonese-language singers
Hong Kong boy bands
Musical quartets